South Korean singer and rapper Heize has released two studio albums, seven extended plays (EP), 30 singles—including eight soundtrack appearances—and 19 music videos. Heize's earliest known musical appearance was a rap feature on the November 2013 single "Chilin" by fellow South Korean rapper Crucial Star from his mixtape Drawing #2: A Better Man (2013). She released her eponymous debut hip-hop EP Heize through NHN Entertainment in March 2014. The album was promoted by the singles "After I've Wandered A Bit" featuring Crucial Star, and "Even the Little Club".

Studio albums

Extended plays

Singles

As lead artist

As featured artist

Collaborations

Other charted songs

Music videos

Notes

References 

Discographies of South Korean artists
K-pop discographies